Fernest Arceneaux (August 27, 1940 – September 4, 2008) was a French speaking Creole Zydeco accordionist and singer from Louisiana.

Biography
Arceneaux was born to a large Creole family based in Carencro, Louisiana. Arceneaux first picked up his brother-in-law's accordion as a child and learned to play by copying his father, Ferdinand Arceneaux, who was a Creole musician whom he backed at local house parties. By the 1960s, Arceneaux had switched to guitar in his rock and roll group Fernest and the Thunders.  Not until 1978, at the behest of his hero Clifton Chenier, did Arceneaux return to the accordion. Also in 1978 Arceneaux and his band were discovered by Belgian blues enthusiast Robert Sacre, recorded their first album, and began touring heavily, particularly in Europe. Arceneaux later earned the title "The New Prince of Accordion" for his virtuostic playing.

In addition to his band Fernest and The Thunders, Arceneaux's discography includes recordings under band names Fernest Arceneaux and the Zydeco All Stars, and Fernest Arceneaux & His Louisiana French Band.

Style
Arceneaux's style was heavily influenced by soul music, including artists Ray Charles and Johnny Ace.

Discography

Studio and live albums

Singles

Various artist compilation albums

Guest appearance credits

References

External links
 
 
Fernest Arceneaux Dies of Natural Causes
Remembering Fernest Arceneaux (1940–2008)

1940 births
2008 deaths
American accordionists
American blues singers
Blues musicians from Louisiana
Musicians from Lafayette, Louisiana
Singers from Louisiana
Zydeco accordionists
20th-century American singers
People from Carencro, Louisiana
20th-century accordionists